is a Japanese voice actress and narrator affiliated with Office Osawa. Some of her notable voice roles include Robin Sena in Witch Hunter Robin, Chachamaru Karakuri in Negima! Magister Negi Magi, Halle Lidner in Death Note, Rito Yuki in To Love Ru, Liz Thompson in Soul Eater, Hitch Dreyse in Attack on Titan, Gou Matsuoka in Free!, and Hamsuke in Overlord.

Filmography

Anime

Video games

Drama CDs

Dubbing

References

External links
  
 Akeno Watanabe  at Ryu's Seiyuu Info
 

1982 births
Living people
People from Funabashi
Japanese video game actresses
Japanese voice actresses
Voice actresses from Chiba Prefecture
Voice actors from Funabashi
20th-century Japanese actresses
21st-century Japanese actresses